National Parks are a legally-defined type of protected area of Brazil. 
The first parks were created in the 1930s with other parks being gradually added, typically protecting a natural monument such as a waterfall or gorge near to a coastal population centre.
At least two early parks were later submerged by hydroelectric reservoirs.
The first park in the Amazon rainforest was inaugurated in 1974. Today the national parks cover a huge area, particularly in the Amazon.
However, many of them suffer from outstanding claims for compensation from former owners or users of the land, and many lack the management plans, physical infrastructure and personnel needed to support public visits.
The responsible government agency does not have the capacity to provide services such as food and drink, souvenir sales and guided tours, and bureaucracy has delayed letting the private sector bid on providing such services.

Definition

National parks are the oldest type of protected area in Brazil.
Their goal is to preserve ecosystems of great ecological importance and scenic beauty, and to support scientific research, education,  environmental interpretation, recreation and eco-tourism through contact with nature. At the federal level the parks are managed by the Chico Mendes Institute for Biodiversity Conservation.
State parks fall under the same regulations as national parks. 
Both types are now defined by law 9.985 of July 2000.
They are classed as IUCN protected area category II.

The parks are publicly owned, and any privately owned land within their boundary must be expropriated.
Existing landowners and communities with land use rights have to be relocated and given compensation.
With strictly limited budgets, poor land records and inefficient bureaucracy it can take many years to complete this process.

Conditions for public visits are defined in the park's management plan.
Officially a park may not be visited by the public unless it has a management plan and public use plan.
Scientific research requires prior authorization from the responsible agency and is subject to conditions and restrictions.

History

The concept of "national park" was first defined in the 1934 forest code.
The system of national parks started in 1937 with the creation of Itatiaia National Park.
Another two national parks were created in 1939, then after a period of 20 years, the program of park creation was restarted in the late 1950s.
The Ubajara National Park was created in 1959, protecting a limestone cave in the semi-arid caatinga biome of the north east.
The Paulo Afonso and Sete Quedas national parks were created in 1948 and 1961 respectively to let visitors see exceptional waterfalls and rapids. Although all countries define national parks as permanent, Brazil violated this principal and submerged the features under the dams of hydroelectric power plants.

The forest code was revised in 1965 to cover all types of native vegetation, not just "forests".
National parks and the newly-defined biological reserves were defined as having the goal of "protecting exceptional natural attributes, reconciling the full protection of flora, fauna and natural beauties with the use for educational, recreational and scientific purposes."
Under the 1934 and 1965 codes the parks and other conservation units have been created by executive decree.
As a result, Congress has tended not to give strong support to the parks, but they have been protected against ongoing congressional attempts to shrink or eliminate the parks.

Many of the parks have their origins in federal or state forestry reserves used for a variety of research or conservation purposes, then donated to the federal government to become national parks.
The effect of this random development was that by the late 1970s many of the parks were near coastal population centres.
The Emas, Chapada dos Veadeiros, Brasília and Araguaia parks were in the interior, but situated where they could be used for leisure by government workers in Brasilia, which had become the national capital in 1960.
The Amazônia National Park was created in 1974 on the Tapajós River, the first in the Amazon.
It was designed to be accessible via the trans-Amazonian highway, which ran through the park.
By 1978 there were eighteen national parks, of which nine were in the coastal Atlantic Forest biome near to large cities, typically including a monumental feature as the main attraction.

Since then the number of parks increased steadily to 33 by 1990 and 64 by 2010.
These 64 parks cover . The largest are in the Amazon biome of the north and west of the country.
It is costly to compensate former owners or people with usage rights and to prepare management plans.
Funding is limited so many parks remained inaccessible to the public.
Another issue is the cost of providing infrastructure and personnel to supervise visitors.
Finally, for many years a park that generated income from visitors did not receive any benefit.

In 1998 the Iguaçu National Park experimented with outsourcing public use services, causing a rise in visitor numbers.
The private concessions in the Foz do Iguacu National Park allowed construction of a visitor centre, parking spaces, food and beverage services, transport service in the park and leisure and adventures activities.
The experiment was not repeated elsewhere for several years.

Recent years

Between 2006 and 2013 the number of visits to federal protected areas, mostly to national parks, tripled to 6.3 million.
In 2007 the Chico Mendes Institute for Biodiversity Conservation (ICMBio) was created to manage federal conservation units, including national parks, taking over from the Brazilian Institute of Environment and Renewable Natural Resources (IBAMA).
More funds were made available for settling expropriation claims, and a system of environmental compensation was introduced to support investment in parks. 
The result has been growth in the number of parks with management plans and clear land ownership. 
These may qualify for outsourced public use services.
Private concessions have been used in parks such as Tijuca and Fernando de Noronha, and more are planned.

Of the 67 national parks in 2010, 19 protected an area that represents 5% of the original Amazon rainforest, and another 22 protected 1% of the original Atlantic Forest. 
Seven parks protected the Caatinga ecoregion and twelve the Cerrado ecoregion. There were only six coastal and marine parks, including one that protected the Pantanal wetland. No park protected the Pampas.
Most protected areas created in the 2000s had the primary goal of reducing deforestation, and little effort has been made to promote public use.
A 2012 survey showed that only 44% of Brazilians knew what a protected area was, and only 1% of those knew their purpose was to promote tourism and recreation.

The parks vary greatly in size between the  Tijuca Forest in Rio de Janeiro and the  Tumucumaque Mountains National Park in the Amazon.
By 2010 only 30 parks were accessible to the public. 
Of these, the two most visited were the Tijuca with 1.7 million visitors and the Iguaçu with 1 million visitors, together accounting for 71% of all visits to national parks in Brazil in 2009.
In 2011 it was estimated that the potential revenue from Brazil's national parks could be around R$1.7 billion annually by 2016.
In 2012 ICMBio earned R$24 million from entrance fees and services, mostly from just four parks.
As of 2012 there were 68 national parks but only 26 were officially open to visitors.
Some of the others received visitors informally.

Chapada dos Veadeiros National Park illustrates the problem. 
It is a World Heritage Site and has unique cerrado vegetation and hundreds of waterfalls and other bodies of water.
Just 22,950 tourists visited the park in 2009.
There is only one park entrance, and very limited tourist infrastructure.
ICMBio does not charge an entrance fee, and is unable to sell food, drinks and souvenirs.
Bureaucratic problems have delayed opening these services to private enterprise.

Map

List of parks

See also
Conservation in Brazil

References

Sources 

Types of protected area of Brazil